The 1933 International cricket season was from April 1933 to August 1933.

Season overview

June

Scotland in Ireland

West Indies in England

July

Free Foresters in Netherlands

August

MCC in Netherlands

References

1933 in cricket